Athletes Unlimited Basketball is a women's professional basketball league in the United States, founded in 2022. Athletes Unlimited announced the intention to create a basketball league on October 12, 2021, following the creations of Athletes Unlimited Softball, Athletes Unlimited Volleyball, and Athletes Unlimited Lacrosse.

League History
Athletes Unlimited was founded by Jonathan Soros and Jon Patricof. There are no team owners, and league investors are capping their returns. Athletes share in the league profits, and are involved in the daily decision making. 

The format in which teams are redrafted each week allows athletes to accumulate points for both individual and team performances, culminating with one individual winner. 

The first season of AU Basketball will feature 44 players competing in a five-week season from January 26 through February 26, 2022 and take place in Las Vegas.

The second season was played in Dallas, Texas and ran from February 22nd to March 26th.

Champions

See also
Basketball in the United States

References

Basketball competitions in the United States
Sports leagues established in 2022
Professional sports leagues in the United States